Kate McIlroy (born 26 August 1981)  is a New Zealand cyclist, triathlete and former runner. She won the World Mountain Running title in 2005 and was later named New Zealand Sportswoman of the Year at the Halberg Awards.

She is the national women's record holder for the 3000 metre steeplechase with a time of 9:32.54 set in Heusden, Belgium during 2006.

McIlroy converted to track in a bid to compete at the 2008 Beijing Olympics, but sustained a leg injury and was unable recover in time.

She started competing in triathlons at the end of 2008. In 2012, she was selected to compete at the 2012 Summer Olympics in the triathlon, where she finished in 10th place.

Achievements
2017: 3rd place New Zealand Elite Road Cycling Nationals in Napier
2017: 30th place, Cadel Evans Great Ocean Road Race
2016: First female to go under 4 hours at the Taupo Road Race
2014: 12th place in triathlon at the Glasgow Commonwealth Games
2012: Placed 10th in the 2012 London Olympics Triathlon.
2012: 3rd place New Zealand Elite Road Cycling Nationals in Christchurch
2009: Started competing in triathlon, winning a World Cup race in Hungary.
2006: Represented New Zealand at the Commonwealth Games, finishing fifth in the 3000m steeplechase.
2005: Won World Mountain Running champs in Wellington, 
2005: Named New Zealand Sportswomen of the Year at the Halberg Awards.
1997: Named New Zealand Junior Athlete of the Year.

References

External links

1981 births
Living people
New Zealand female triathletes
New Zealand female middle-distance runners
New Zealand female steeplechase runners
New Zealand mountain runners
Triathletes at the 2012 Summer Olympics
Olympic triathletes of New Zealand
Triathletes at the 2014 Commonwealth Games
World Mountain Running Championships winners
Commonwealth Games competitors for New Zealand